Álvaro López San Martín and Jaume Munar were the defending champions, but were no longer eligible to participate.

Yishai Oliel of Israel and Patrik Rikl of the Czech Republic won the title, defeating Chung Yun-seong and Orlando Luz in the final, 6–3, 6–4.

Seeds

Draw

Finals

Top half

Bottom half

References

Boys' Doubles
2016